The World War II Memorial by John Francis Paramino is installed in Boston, Massachusetts, United States. It was completed during 1947–1949, copyrighted in 1948, and erected in 1949. The bronze and granite war memorial features an allegorical statue of winged female figure of Victory. Behind her is a wall with 27 bronze plaques listing the names of people who died in World War II. The work was surveyed as part of the Smithsonian Institution's "Save Outdoor Sculpture!" program in 1993.

References

External links

 

1948 sculptures
1949 establishments in Massachusetts
Allegorical sculptures in the United States
Bronze sculptures in Massachusetts
Fenway–Kenmore
Granite sculptures in Massachusetts
Monuments and memorials in Boston
Outdoor sculptures in Boston
Sculptures of mythology
Sculptures of women in Massachusetts
Statues in Boston
Victory
World War II memorials in the United States